Oliver McCall (born April 21, 1965) is an American former professional boxer. A veteran of the sport for over three decades, he is best known for winning the WBC heavyweight title in 1994 by scoring an upset knockout victory over Lennox Lewis. The next year he defended the title against Larry Holmes before losing it to Frank Bruno. McCall is known for an in-ring mental breakdown during his 1997 rematch with Lewis. McCall's son, Elijah, is also a heavyweight professional boxer. McCall is known for having  never been knocked down in any of his 74 bout professional career.

Early life
Born in Chicago, McCall moved to live with his mother in Racine, Wisconsin and attended William Horlick High School, before transferring to Washington Park High School. McCall was also a talented high school basketball player. In 1981, however, McCall moved back to Chicago where he pursued boxing and won two Chicago Golden Gloves titles.

Amateur career
At the amateur ranks McCall competed in super heavyweight division (+201 lbs.)

Highlights
National Golden Gloves (super heavyweight), Statehouse Convention Center, Little Rock, Arkansas, March 1985:
1/16: Lost to Tevin George by decision
Chicago Championships (heavyweight), Clarendon Park, Chicago, Illinois, April 1985:
1/2: Defeated Roderick Wilbur by decision
Finals: (no data available)
 5th Sarge Johnson Memorial Boxing Tournament (super heavyweight), Convention Center, Indianapolis, Indiana, July 1985:
Defeated Larry Thomas RSC 1

Professional career
Known as "The Atomic Bull", McCall turned pro in 1985 and slowly worked his way up the heavyweight ranks. His trainer at that time was the retired champion Joe Frazier. Oliver had a bit of trouble, losing his second bout and losing to Mike Hunter and Buster Douglas in 1988 and 1989 respectively. His eighth opponent was Al Evans, who scored a TKO victory over Mike Tyson in 1981,  when Tyson was a 15 year old just beginning his amateur career. McCall won by a unanimous decision.  Oliver beat Jesse Ferguson and future heavyweight champion Bruce Seldon. In 1992 Oliver lost a very close decision to Tony Tucker before landing the shot against Lewis in 1994.

Lewis vs McCall 

After a close first round McCall came out aggressively in the second and landed his signature counter right hand as Lewis moved forward. Lewis dropped to the canvas and got up before the count of ten, but he was unsteady on his feet, forcing the referee to wave a stop to the fight. In spite of the Lewis camp protests, Boxing Monthly editor Glyn Leach pointed out that Lewis "only seemed to recover his senses once the fight was waved off," and that "in the opinions of everyone I spoke to at ringside, the decision was correct."

McCall's win over Lewis marked Don King's return to power in the heavyweight division, since none of his stable of fighters had been able to win the heavyweight title since Mike Tyson lost it in 1990 (McCall worked as a sparring partner with Tyson and Cooper, and claimed Cooper is the harder puncher.) He successfully defended the title in a bout against 45-year-old ex-champ Larry Holmes in Las Vegas winning 114–113, 115–114, and 115–112 on the score cards, before returning to London to face Frank Bruno in 1995.

During a press conference before the fight McCall claimed he was going to get revenge for America after Gerald McClellan had been rendered brain damaged after a fight with Nigel Benn a few months earlier. He had claimed that he was going to hurt Bruno and that the only thing Bruno would be able to do was throw illegal rabbit punches.

The fight took place at the old Wembley stadium. Bruno started off well, working behind the jab and landing some big right hands. McCall seemed uninterested in fighting and lagged far behind on the score cards going into the latter rounds. By round 9 Bruno had built up a big lead on the score cards and looked comfortably in charge. McCall finally sparked into life in round 10 perhaps realizing that he was behind on the score cards. McCall landed several big punches over the final 3 rounds and had Bruno in trouble several times but Bruno managed to hold on and win the title by a unanimous decision.

This gave McCall the distinction of becoming the first Heavyweight champion in history to both win and lose the title to a British fighter, and also the first American Heavyweight champion to have both won and lost the title in Britain (and Europe).

McCall returned to the ring 6 months after losing his title when he beat future WBC heavyweight champion Oleg Maskaev in less than 3 minutes. By that time his trainers were Greg Page and George Benton. A month later after defeating Maskaev, McCall beat James Stanton in 6 rounds.

Lewis vs. McCall II

Lewis and McCall squared off again on February 7, 1997, in Las Vegas. In a bizarre fight, McCall refused to fight in the fourth and fifth rounds, beginning to cry and eventually forcing the referee to stop the fight and award Lewis the victory.  The referee for the fight, Mills Lane, stated in an interview after the match, "In the third round, he got in close, and then seemed frustrated, and then he just backed off and put his arms down. . . . I thought he was playing possum but then I saw his lips started to quiver and I thought, 'My God, is he crying?'" Lane stopped the fight when McCall had refused to defend himself for several rounds.

Aiming for another shot at the title 
In 2001 at the age of 36 he resurrected his career with a tenth-round knockout of Henry Akinwande, at the time one of the most avoided contenders in the world, on a Lennox Lewis undercard in Las Vegas.  McCall was ranked number 4 in the world off this performance, but was arrested shortly afterwards and imprisoned for over a year, losing his ranking.

In December 2004 he lost a close points decision to fellow contender DaVarryl Williamson on a high-profile Don King undercard from New York, and in 2005 he traveled to Germany for an eliminator to skillful and well regarded Cuban Juan Carlos Gomez, and was outpointed over ten rounds.  However this loss was removed from McCall's record as Gomez later failed a drug test.

Despite his legal troubles, McCall's career continued. He began his next run at a title with a first-round TKO of Kenny Craven in June 2006.

McCall defeated Darroll Wilson in a fourth-round TKO in Louisville, Kentucky, on September 9, 2006, for the WBC Fecarbox Championship.

On December 9, 2006, McCall defeated Yanqui Diaz via seventh-round KO in Hollywood, Florida.

On 16 June 2007, McCall defeated Sinan Samil Sam for the WBC International Heavyweight Championship by unanimous decision in Ankara, Turkey.

The long inactive McCall defeated Australian John Hopoate by 2nd-round TKO on the May 22, 2009, for the vacant IBA intercontinental heavyweight belt. McCall dominated the fight and knocked Hopoate down twice.

He defended his IBA continental belt against Franklin Lawrence by a ten-round unanimous decision on August 21, 2009, at the Orleans Hotel & Casino, Las Vegas.

On October 23, 2009, he defended his IBA continental title again by a ten-round unanimous decision against 6'8" Lance Whitaker.

McCall's next opponent was Timur Ibragimov. The two fought at the Seminole Hard Rock Hotel and Casino, Hollywood, Florida. Ibragimov was a fringe contender with a 27-2-1 record. McCall lost the bout by unanimous decision, with the scores of 117–111 twice and 119–109. It was his first loss since his comeback in 2009.

Legal troubles
McCall's career has been mottled by several stints in drug rehabilitation facilities and arrests for disorderly behavior.  He has attempted numerous comebacks, though the efforts have repeatedly been frustrated by run-ins with the law.

In January 2006 he was arrested by police in Nashville, Tennessee, who say they had to use a Taser on McCall after he tried running away from officers trying to arrest him for trespassing in a public housing development.

Police officers informed the media that McCall had in his possession a glass pipe and a five-dollar bill containing a small amount of cocaine. They further stated that the 40-year-old McCall later spat at an officer and threatened to kill him. He was held on $299,000 bond and charged with criminal trespass, resisting arrest, assaulting police officers, threatening to kill an officer, and being a fugitive from justice on charges in his home state of Virginia. He was released on May 8, 2006.

On the weekend before his scheduled fight with Zuri Lawrence at the Seminole Hard Rock Hotel & Casino in nearby Hollywood, Florida, McCall was arrested for possession of cocaine and drug paraphernalia in Fort Lauderdale, preventing him from fighting. He was ultimately sentenced to probation. McCall was able to get another big fight, this time against Fres Oquendo, scheduled for December 7, 2010. McCall won in a split decision over the favored Oquendo.

On December 9, 2010, two days after his latest victory, McCall was again arrested in Fort Lauderdale for possession of cannabis and violation of municipal ordinance, causing him to violate the terms of his probation stemming from the February cocaine charge. As a result of the probation violation, he was facing six years in Florida State Prison. The Law Office of Roger P. Foley, P.A. represented McCall and was able to have him reinstated on his previous probationary term, modified to include drug and psychological evaluation followed by any necessary treatment. On December 16, 2011, his probation was terminated.

Professional boxing record

References

External links

1965 births
Living people
Boxers from Chicago
African-American boxers
American male boxers
World heavyweight boxing champions
World Boxing Council champions
William Horlick High School alumni
21st-century African-American people
20th-century African-American sportspeople